Club Deportivo Huachipato is a Chilean football club based in Talcahuano that is a current member of the Chilean Primera División.

The club was founded 7 June 1947 and plays its home games at the Estadio CAP, which has a capacity of 10,500 people (all-seated).

History
In 1947, CD Huachipato was officially notarized, and the first official recorded game was played. The original fans were the local company employees of the steel industry in Huachipato. It took a few years for the club to achieve its first successes, obtaining regional championships in 1956 and 1964.

In its early seasons, "the Steelers" (Acereros), as they are known, were quite satisfactory in the second division. The 1965 debut was against Municipal de Santiago with a 3–0 victory.

After 36 games the standings would show Huachipato second with 46 points, 3 points less than that of Ferrobádminton another second division team that took the championship and thus passage (which is how it was granted in those years) to the First Division.

However, a year later (1966), the Steelers managed promotion to first division, after winning the second division champions Chile with 49 points, they remained well above teams like Coquimbo (42 points) and San Antonio (39) who stayed with the second and third place respectively after thirty games.

With only two years in the professionalism of Talcahuano, Huachipato was installed in the top flight professional football in Chile, La Primera División.

With a tie on a goal, as local and against Audax Italiano, the "Steelers" debuted in first division. In the first season of first division, Huachipato an acceptable term in sixth place among 18 teams, although the tournament was on two wheels. The following years were quiet for steel, culminating their shares in the mid-high zone of the standings. However, a few years after this change, Huachipato won the 1974 First Division Football Championship, with this triumph they are the only Chilean Football team from the south of Chile to obtain the title.

1974 was a year that many Huachipato fans will never forget, after 34 matches played, Huachipato had to beat Aviación to become champions in their last match, and they did it, Moisés Silva scored the only goal that crowned Huchipato champions that year.

Since then the club has never won any other title, but it has always caused difficulties for the big teams when playing against Huachipato, especially in the Estadio Las Higueras, their former home ground.

From the end of the 1990s, Huachipato was characterized by a club trainer of players from lower divisions. Examples of these are important values' steelmaker emerged from the quarry as Roberto Cartes, Cristian Uribe, Rodrigo Rain, Cristián Reynero, Rodrigo Millar, Mario Salgado, Héctor Mancilla, Gonzalo Jara, Pedro Morales, Mauricio Arias, among others.

As for sporting achievements, reached the Semi-Finals in the Torneos Apertura in the years 2003, 2004, 2005 and 2006. In addition, since the end of the 1990s, Huachipato classification achieved an international tournament and the Copa Sudamericana 2006 and their second championship since 38 years, after defeating Unión Española in the 2012 Chilean Clausura Tournament final.

Badge
The club's badge was inspired by the Steelmark logo owned by the American Iron and Steel Institute that is also used by an American football team in the United States, the Pittsburgh Steelers.

Official sponsors
Mitre
Corporación de Acero del Pacífico (ACEROCAP)

Dates and Honours

Club Facts
 Seasons in Primera División: 49 (1967-1978, 1983–1990, 1992, 1995-)
 Seasons in Primera B: 9 (1965-1966, 1979–1982, 1991, 1993–1994)
 Copa Libertadores appearances: 2 (1975, 2013)
 Copa Sudamericana appearances: 3 (2006, 2014, 2015)

Titles
Primera División: 2
1974, 2012-C

Segunda División: 1
1966

Copa Apertura Segunda División: 2
1979, 1983

South American cups history

Records
Record Primera División victory — 6–0 v. Aviación (1975) & U. La Calera (2014 C)
Record Primera División defeat — 0–7 v. Palestino (1978)
Record Copa Chile victory — 12–1 v. Luchador de Lican-Ray (2010)
Most goals scored (Primera División matches) — 60, Héctor Mancilla (2000–2005, 2015 C)
Highest home attendance  — 43,340 v. Colo-Colo (12 November 1967) (at Regional de Concepción)
Primera División Best Position  — Champions (1974, 2012 C)
Copa Chile Best Season  — Runner-up (2013–14)

Other sports
Although best known as a professional football club, the club has other sports branches; these are: basketball, karate, taekwondo, artistic roller skating, roller hockey, tennis, table tennis, volleyball, futsal, among others.

Players

Current squad

2022 Summer transfers

In

Out

Managers

  José Luis Boffi (1954–56)
  Amadeo Silva (1962)
  Luis Vera (1966)
  Andrés Prieto (1969–70)
  Caupolicán Peña (1971)
  Pedro Morales (1974)
  Miguel Ángel Ruiz (1975)
  Armando Tobar (1975)
  Salvador Biondi (1976)
  Alberto Fouilloux (1977–78)
  Armando Tobar (1978)
  Francisco Hormazábal (1983)
  Luis Ibarra (1984)
  Luis Vera (1985)
  Antonio Vargas (1985–86)
  Luis Vera (1986–87)
  Nelson Gatica (1987)
  Manfredo González (1987–90)
  Germán Cornejo (1991)
  Manuel Keosseián (July 1, 1992 – June 30, 1993)
  Rolando García (1994)
  Jorge Solari (2000)
  Oscar Garré (July 1, 2001 – Dec 29, 2003)
  Arturo Salah (July 1, 2004 – June 30, 2007)
  Antonio Zaracho (2007–08)
  Fernando Vergara (March 1, 2008 – Sept 12, 2009)
  Pedro García (2009)
  Arturo Salah (Nov 21, 2009 – Sept 1, 2011)
  Alejandro Padilla (2011)
  Jorge Pellicer (Sept 12, 2011 – Dec 3, 2013)
  Mario Salas (Dec 12, 2013–14)
  Hugo Vilches (2015)
  Miguel Ponce (2016- June, 2017)
  César Vigevani (June, 2017 - Dec 31, 2017)
  Nicolás Larcamón (2018-)

External links

Club Deportivo Huachipato – Web Site
Acereros.Cl Sitio de los hinchas

 
Huachipato
Huachipato
Sport in Biobío Region
Association football clubs established in 1947
1947 establishments in Chile